Haya (roughly corresponding to: bashfulness, decency, modesty, shyness) is an Arabic word that means "natural or inherent, shyness and a sense of modesty". In Islamic terminology, it is mainly used in the context of modesty. Haya encourages Muslims to avoid anything considered to be distasteful or abominable. Haya plays an important role in Islam, as it is one of the most important parts of Iman. The antonym of Haya in Arabic is badha'a (immodesty) or fahisha (lewdness or obscenity).

Etymology
The word itself is derived from the word Hayat, which means "life". The original meaning of Haya refers to "a bad or uneasy feeling accompanied by embarrassment".

Importance
Haya is important for Muslims and in Islamic cultures—for both men and women. In the Qur'an, verses explain how men and women should behave. According to the values of Haya, a man must control himself by marrying as young as feasible. If a man cannot afford to marry, then he should fast, in order for him not to be overtaken by his desires and the whispers of Shaytan. The values of Haya dictate that women must conceal themselves as well.

Say to the believing men that they should lower their gaze and guard their modesty: that will make for greater purity for them: and Allah is well acquainted with all that they do. And say to the believing women that they should lower their gaze and guard their modesty; that they should not display their beauty and ornaments except what (must ordinarily) appear thereof; that they should draw their veils over their bosoms and not display their beauty...
— Quran 24:30–31

In Scripture

In the Qur'an
The Qur'an mentions Haya twice:

In the Ahadith
Haya is mentioned often in hadith passages, where the word is used to express shyness, modesty, and decency.

See also 

 Islamic clothing

References

Modesty in Islam
Arabic words and phrases in Sharia
Islamic terminology
Hadith
Sharia legal terminology